Sergei or Sergei Akimov may refer to:

 Sergei Akimov (Estonian footballer), Estonian footballer with FC Flora Rakvere
 Sergei Akimov (footballer) (born 1987), Russian footballer
 Sergei Akimov (ice hockey) (born 1976), Russian hockey player